"What U Workin' With?" is a song recorded by American singers Gwen Stefani and Justin Timberlake for the official soundtrack to the 2016 film Trolls. Timberlake co-wrote and co-produced the track with Max Martin and Ilya Salmanzadeh with additional writing from Savan Kotecha and Peter Svensson. The song was first announced on August 22, 2016, with Stefani's appearance being a secret. An urban and dance song, the lyrics talk about having a good time and standing out amongst a crowd.

The track was favorably reviewed by several contemporary music critics; although many found Stefani's contribution to be unexpected, they agreed her role was enjoyable. Commercially, "What U Workin' With?" peaked at number eight on Billboards Kid Digital Songs component chart, where it lasted for three non-consecutive weeks.

Background and release 
The track listing for Trolls was released by Justin Timberlake through Instagram on August 22, 2016, where he unveiled the names of thirteen tracks for the album. Additionally, "What U Workin' With?" was first revealed, although Gwen Stefani's role on the track had remained a secret. In addition, he claimed that the record was "almost ready" and that preorders would be announced in the near future. The release of the soundtrack was fronted by Timberlake's "Can't Stop the Feeling!", which was made available as a digital download on May 6, 2016, while the album in its entirety was released on September 23 of the same year. "What U Workin' With?" was written by Timberlake, Max Martin, Ilya Salmanzadeh, Savan Kotecha, and Peter Svensson, while the production was handled by the former three. On December 30, 2016, Stefani hosted a "dance party" at her home before uploading videos of herself and boyfriend Blake Shelton dancing along to "What You Workin' With?" during the event to her Snapchat and Musical.ly accounts.

Composition and recording 
An urban and dance song, it marks Stefani and Timberlake's first collaboration since the 2001 charity single "What's Going On". During the recording process, Timberlake spoke cheerfully of the sessions and stated: "I have always envisioned bringing the two worlds of film and music together for one epic event [and] couldn't be more excited that they will collide in DreamWork's Trolls." Regarding the music itself, Stefani sings about standing out and remaining original as her verses lead up to the chorus; she leads, "This is the moment when everybody's in the light / So what you working with?".

Reception 
Christina Lee from Idolator called it "as assertive" as Stefani's "Hollaback Girl" (2005), which she considered a good thing, while Kayleigh Hughes from Bustle described it as "super cool". Additionally, Allison Bowsher from Much claimed that the artists, including Stefani and Timberlake, within the soundtrack created "awesome music". Jonathan Hamard from Aficia compared the track to Stefani's 2004 song "Rich Girl" and the material on her third studio album, This Is What the Truth Feels Like (2016). He felt her role in Trolls was a good move and claimed that Stefani's verses came off as cool and unpretentious. Similarly, Nadia N. from Virgin Radio saw the release as unexpected but praised the dancing qualities of the track. 

"What U Workin' With?" debuted on Billboards Kid Digital Songs component chart on October 15, 2016 at number eight; it entered simultaneously with the duo's other collaboration, "Hair Up", which debuted at number 14. It dropped off the following week, but re-entered during the week of November 26, 2016, where it was ranked at number ten. It spent a total of three weeks on the Kid Digital Songs chart, leaving at number fifteen on December 3, 2016.

Charts

References 

2016 songs
Gwen Stefani songs
Justin Timberlake songs
Song recordings produced by Justin Timberlake
Song recordings produced by Max Martin
Song recordings produced by Ilya Salmanzadeh
Songs written by Justin Timberlake
Songs written by Max Martin
Songs written by Ilya Salmanzadeh
Songs written by Savan Kotecha
Songs written by Peter Svensson
Songs written for animated films
Trolls (franchise)